Leonardo dos Santos Silva (born 21 August 1976) is a former Brazilian footballer who played as a winger. Leonardo's former clubs in the Netherlands include FC Groningen, Feyenoord Rotterdam, De Graafschap, ADO Den Haag, MVV, FC Dordrecht and FC Emmen. During his time at Feyenoord he was better known as Leonardo II because Leonardo Santiago also played for the club at that time using the name Leonardo.

After retiring, he worked as administrative assistant to the Brazilian consulate in Rotterdam.

Honours
Feyenoord
 UEFA Cup: 2002

References

External links
 

Living people
1976 births
Footballers from Rio de Janeiro (city)
Association football midfielders
Brazilian footballers
CR Flamengo footballers
FC Groningen players
Feyenoord players
De Graafschap players
ADO Den Haag players
MVV Maastricht players
FC Dordrecht players
FC Emmen players
UEFA Cup winning players
Eredivisie players
Eerste Divisie players
Brazilian expatriate footballers
Expatriate footballers in the Netherlands
Brazilian expatriate sportspeople in the Netherlands